Felipe Ely Klein (born April 9, 1987 in Porto Alegre) is a Brazilian footballer currently playing for Cerro of the Uruguayan Primera División.

References

 Profile at BDFA 
 
 Profile at Tenfield Digital

1987 births
Living people
Brazilian footballers
Brazilian expatriate footballers
Association football forwards
Uruguayan Primera División players
Fortaleza Esporte Clube players
Cerro Largo F.C. players
C.A. Cerro players
Expatriate footballers in Uruguay
Brazilian expatriate sportspeople in Uruguay
Footballers from Porto Alegre